In the mathematical area of topology, the generalized Poincaré conjecture is a statement that a manifold which is a homotopy sphere  a sphere. More precisely, one fixes a category of manifolds: topological (Top), piecewise linear (PL), or differentiable (Diff). Then the statement is

Every homotopy sphere (a closed n-manifold which is homotopy equivalent to the n-sphere) in the chosen category (i.e. topological manifolds, PL manifolds, or smooth manifolds) is isomorphic in the chosen category (i.e. homeomorphic, PL-isomorphic, or diffeomorphic) to the standard n-sphere.

The name derives from the Poincaré conjecture, which was made for (topological or PL) manifolds of dimension 3, where being a homotopy sphere is equivalent to being simply connected and closed. The generalized Poincaré conjecture is known to be true or false in a number of instances, due to the work of many distinguished topologists, including the Fields medal awardees John Milnor, Steve Smale, Michael Freedman, and Grigori Perelman.

Status
Here is a summary of the status of the generalized Poincaré conjecture in various settings.

 Top: true in all dimensions.
 PL: true in dimensions other than 4; unknown in dimension 4, where it is equivalent to Diff.
 Diff: false generally, the first known counterexample is in dimension 7. True in some dimensions including 1, 2, 3, 5, 6, 12, 56 and 61. The case of dimension 4 is equivalent to PL and is unsettled . The previous list includes all odd dimensions and all even dimensions between 6 and 62 for which the conjecture is true; it may be true for some additional even dimensions  though it is conjectured that this is not the case. 

Thus the veracity of the Poincaré conjectures changes according to which category it is formulated in. More generally the notion of isomorphism differs between the categories Top, PL, and Diff. It is the same in dimension 3 and below. In dimension 4, PL and Diff agree, but Top differs. In dimensions above 6 they all differ. In dimensions 5 and 6 every PL manifold admits an infinitely differentiable structure that is so-called Whitehead compatible.

History
The cases n = 1 and 2 have long been known by the classification of manifolds in those dimensions.

Shortly after Smale's announcement of a proof, John Stallings gave a different proof for dimensions at least 7 that a PL homotopy n-sphere was homeomorphic to the n-sphere, using the notion of "engulfing". E. C. Zeeman modified Stalling's construction to work in dimensions 5 and 6. In 1962, Smale proved that a PL homotopy n-sphere is PL-isomorphic to the standard PL n-sphere for n at least 5. In 1966, M. H. A. Newman extended PL engulfing to the topological situation and proved that for  a topological homotopy n-sphere is homeomorphic to the n-sphere.

Michael Freedman solved the topological case  in 1982 and received a Fields Medal in 1986. The initial proof consisted of a 50-page outline, with many details missing. Freedman gave a series of lectures at the time, convincing experts that the proof was correct. A project to produce a written version of the proof with background and all details filled in began in 2013, with Freedman's support. The project's output, edited by Stefan Behrens, Boldizsar Kalmar, Min Hoon Kim, Mark Powell, and Arunima Ray, with contributions from 20 mathematicians, was published in August 2021 in the form of a 496 page book, The Disc Embedding Theorem.

Grigori Perelman solved the case  (where the topological, PL, and differentiable cases all coincide) in 2003 in a sequence of three papers. He was offered a Fields Medal in August 2006 and the Millennium Prize from the Clay Mathematics Institute in March 2010, but declined both.

Exotic spheres
The generalized Poincaré conjecture is true topologically, but false smoothly in some dimensions. This results from the construction of the exotic spheres, manifolds that are homeomorphic, but not diffeomorphic, to the standard sphere, which can be interpreted as non-standard smooth structures on the standard (topological) sphere.

Thus the homotopy spheres that John Milnor produced are homeomorphic (Top-isomorphic, and indeed piecewise linear homeomorphic) to the standard sphere , but are not diffeomorphic (Diff-isomorphic) to it, and thus are exotic spheres: they can be interpreted as non-standard differentiable structures on the standard sphere.

Michel Kervaire and Milnor showed that the oriented 7-sphere has 28 = (7) different smooth structures (or 15 ignoring orientations), and in higher dimensions there are usually many different smooth structures on a sphere. It is suspected that certain differentiable structures on the 4-sphere, called Gluck twists, are not isomorphic to the standard one, but at the moment there are no known invariants capable of distinguishing different smooth structures on a 4-sphere.

PL
For piecewise linear manifolds, the Poincaré conjecture is true except possibly in dimension 4, where the answer is unknown, and equivalent to the smooth case.
In other words, every compact PL manifold of dimension not equal to 4 that is homotopy equivalent to a sphere is PL isomorphic to a sphere.

References

Geometric topology
Homotopy theory
Conjectures